Jack Sydney Bates Gentry CIE CBE (4 October 1899 – 16 April 1978) was an English first-class cricketer. Gentry was a right-handed batsman who bowled slow left-arm orthodox spin.

Gentry was educated at Christ's Hospital, where he represented the school cricket team.

Gentry made his first-class debut for Hampshire, playing a single match for the county against Essex in 1919.

In 1922 Gentry joined Surrey County Cricket Club, making his debut for the county against a touring Scotland side. Gentry played eight first-class matches for Surrey in 1922 and followed that up with two further appearances for Surrey in 1923, with his final appearance for the county coming against Leicestershire. During the 1922 season, Gentry took 31 wickets at a bowling average of 21.54 and coming second in Surrey's averages that season.

In 1925 Gentry played a single first-class match for Essex against Yorkshire at Leyton Cricket Ground.

In Gentry's first-class career he took 36 wickets at a bowling average of 22.05, with best figures of 4/36. Gentry was renowned as being extremely accurate with his slow left-arm orthodox spin, but lacked the spin of the great bowlers and was in fact more effective on hard wickets than on soft.

Gentry died at Loxwood, Sussex on 16 April 1978 following a long illness.

External links
Jack Gentry at Cricinfo
Jack Gentry at CricketArchive

References

1899 births
1978 deaths
People educated at Christ's Hospital
English cricketers
Hampshire cricketers
Surrey cricketers
Essex cricketers
Commanders of the Order of the British Empire
Companions of the Order of the Indian Empire
People from Wanstead
People from Chichester District